Peter Luger (January 22, 1866 – January 21, 1941) was a German chef and restaurateur, who founded Peter Luger Steak House in 1887.

Early life
Peter Luger was born in Bavaria, Germany, and immigrated to the United States when he was 13 years old. He lived in Brooklyn.

Restaurant business
In 1887, Peter opened a pool hall and bowling alley with his nephew Carl in Williamsburg, Brooklyn, called "Carl Luger's Café, Billiards and Bowling Alley". Peter transformed the building into a steak house and renamed it to Peter Luger Steak House. Peter was known for his serious demeanor and was present almost every evening. He created a "no-frills" atmosphere in his restaurant.

Other sources say it was his father Carl that founded the original business and nephew Carl was the chef when Peter inherited the business after his father's death.

Death
Luger died on January 21, 1941, leaving a $241,806 estate. Ownership of the restaurant passed to his son Frederick Luger. Frederick was unable to maintain the quality of steak his father served and sold the failing business to longtime customer Sol Forman, who owned a metalware store across the street. Forman restored the restaurant to its original prestige.

References

German chefs
American people of German descent
1866 births
1941 deaths
People from Brooklyn
American restaurateurs